Euippodes is a genus of moths of the family Erebidae. The genus was erected by George Hampson in 1926.

Species
Euippodes diversa Berio, 1956
Euippodes euprepes Hampson, 1926
Euippodes ituriensis Gaede, 1940
Euippodes perundulata Berio, 1956

References

Calpinae